Khirbet al-Sawda (also spelled Khirbet al-Soda) is a village in western Syria, administratively part of the Homs Governorate, northwest of Homs. Nearby towns include Khirbet al-Tin Mahmud to the southwest, Qazhal to the south and Dar al-Kabera to the northeast. According to the Central Bureau of Statistics (CBS), Khirbet al-Sawda had a population of 507 in the 2004 census.

References

Populated places in Homs District